Stanislav Izhakovsky (born 22 August 1994) is a Belarusian professional footballer who plays for Gomel.

External links
 
 Profile at Gomel website
 

1994 births
Living people
Belarusian footballers
Association football defenders
FC Gomel players
FC Belshina Bobruisk players
FC Granit Mikashevichi players
FC Sputnik Rechitsa players
FC Shakhtyor Petrikov players
FC Dnepr Rogachev players